Armas Härkönen (1 October 1903, Joroinen - 2 September 1981) was a Finnish agricultural consultant, smallholder and politician. He was a member of the Parliament of Finland from 1958 to 1962. He was at first a member of the Social Democratic Party of Finland (SDP), later he joined the Social Democratic Union of Workers and Smallholders (TPSL).

References

1903 births
1981 deaths
People from Joroinen
People from Mikkeli Province (Grand Duchy of Finland)
Social Democratic Party of Finland politicians
Social Democratic Union of Workers and Smallholders politicians
Members of the Parliament of Finland (1958–62)